Allerton Park may refer to:

Allerton Castle, a Gothic House in North Yorkshire, England
Allerton Garden, a nature preserve and museum on the island of Kauai, Hawaii
Robert Allerton Park, a large nature preserve and public area near Monticello, Illinois